Acacia, commonly known as the wattles or acacias, is a large genus of shrubs and trees in the subfamily Mimosoideae of the pea family Fabaceae. Initially, it comprised a group of plant species native to Africa and Australasia. The genus name is New Latin, borrowed from the Greek , a term used by Dioscorides for a preparation extracted from the leaves and fruit pods of Vachellia nilotica, the original type of the genus. In his Pinax (1623), Gaspard Bauhin mentioned the Greek  from  Dioscorides as the origin of the Latin name.

In the early 2000s, it had become evident that the genus as it stood was not monophyletic and that several divergent lineages needed to be placed in separate genera. It turned out that one lineage comprising over 900 species mainly native to Australia, New Guinea, and Indonesia was not closely related to the much smaller group of African lineage that contained A. nilotica—the type species. This meant that the Australasian lineage (by far the most prolific in number of species) would need to be renamed. Botanist Leslie Pedley named this group Racosperma, which received little acclaim in the botanical community.
Australian botanists proposed a less disruptive solution setting a different type species for Acacia (A. penninervis) and allowing this largest number of species to remain in Acacia, resulting in the two Pan-Tropical lineages being renamed Vachellia and Senegalia, and the two endemic American lineages renamed Acaciella and Mariosousa. Although many botanists still disagreed that this was necessary, this solution was eventually officially adopted at the Melbourne International Botanical Congress in 2011.

Acacia remains a widely used common name across genera.

A number of species have been introduced to various parts of the world, and two million hectares of commercial plantations have been established. The heterogeneous group varies considerably in habit, from mat-like subshrubs to canopy trees in a forest.

Description 

Several species in the genus bear vertically oriented phyllodes, which are green, broadened leaf petioles that function like leaf blades, an adaptation to hot climates and droughts. Some phyllodinous species have a colourful aril on the seed. A few species have cladodes rather than leaves.

Taxonomy 
The genus was first validly named in 1754 by Philip Miller. In 1913 Nathaniel Lord Britton and Addison Brown selected Mimosa scorpioides  (≡ Acacia scorpioides  = Acacia nilotica ), a species from Africa, as the lectotype of the name. The genus as recognized in 1986 contained 1352 species. That year however, Pedley published a paper in which he questioned the monophyletic nature of the genus, and proposed a split into three genera: Acacia sensu stricto (161 species), Senegalia (231 species) and Racosperma (960 species), the last name first proposed in 1829 by Carl Friedrich Philipp von Martius as the name of a section in Acacia, but raised to generic rank in 1835. In 2003, Pedley published a paper with 834 new combinations in Racosperma for species, most of which were formerly placed in Acacia. All but 10 of these species are native to Australasia, where it constitutes the largest plant genus.

In 2003, Anthony Orchard and Bruce Maslin filed a proposal to conserve the name Acacia with a different type in order to retain the Australasian group of species in the genus Acacia. Following a controversial decision to choose a new type for Acacia in 2005, the Australian component of Acacia s.l. now retains the name Acacia. At the 2011 International Botanical Congress held in Melbourne, the decision to use the name Acacia, rather than the proposed Racosperma for this genus, was upheld. Other Acacia s.l. taxa continue to be called Acacia by those who choose to consider the entire group as one genus.

Australian species of the genus Paraserianthes s.l. are deemed its closest relatives, particularly P. lophantha. The nearest relatives of Acacia and Paraserianthes s.l. in turn include the Australian and South East Asian genera Archidendron, Archidendropsis, Pararchidendron and Wallaceodendron, all of the tribe Ingeae.

Etymology
The origin of "wattle" may be an Old Teutonic word meaning "to weave". From around 700 CE,  was used in Old English to refer to the interwoven branches and sticks which formed fences, walls and roofs. Since about 1810 it refers to the Australian legumes that provide these branches.

Species

One species of Acacia (sensu stricto) is native to Madagascar, one to Reunion island, 12 to Asia, and the remaining species (over 900) are native to Australasia and the Pacific Islands. These species were all given combinations by Pedley when he erected the genus Racosperma, hence Acacia pulchella, for example, became Racosperma pulchellum. 
However, these were not upheld with the retypification of Acacia.

Phylogeny 
Acacias in Australia probably evolved their fire resistance about 20 million years ago when fossilised charcoal deposits show a large increase, indicating that fire was a factor even then. With no major mountain ranges or rivers to prevent their spread, the wattles began to spread all over the continent as it dried and fires became more common. They began to form dry, open forests with species of the genera Allocasuarina, Eucalyptus and Callitris (cypress-pines).

The southernmost species in the genus are Acacia dealbata (silver wattle), Acacia longifolia (coast wattle or Sydney golden wattle), Acacia mearnsii (black wattle), and Acacia melanoxylon (blackwood), reaching 43°30' S in Tasmania, Australia.

Fossil record
Acacia-like fossil pods under the name Leguminocarpon are known from late Oligocene deposits at different sites in Hungary. Seed pod fossils of †Acacia parschlugiana and †Acacia cyclosperma are known from Tertiary deposits in Switzerland. †Acacia colchica has been described from the Miocene of West Georgia. Pliocene fossil pollen of an Acacia sp. has been described from West Georgia (including Abkhazia).
Oldest records of fossil Acacia pollen in Australia are from the late Oligocene epoch, 25 million years ago.

Distribution and habitat
They are present in all terrestrial habitats, including alpine settings, rainforests, woodlands, grasslands, coastal dunes and deserts. In drier woodlands or forests they are an  important component of the understory. Elsewhere they may be dominant, as in the Brigalow Belt, Myall woodlands and the eremaean Mulga woodlands.

In Australia, Acacia forest is the second most common forest type after eucalypt forest, covering  or 8% of total forest area. Acacia is also the nation's largest genus of flowering plants with almost 1,000 species found.

Ecology 
Acacia is a common food source and host plant for butterflies of the genus Jalmenus. The imperial hairstreak, Jalmenus evagoras, feeds on at least 25 acacia species. Many reptiles feed on the sap, such as the native house gecko in Australia. The sap is also consumed by bugs (Hemiptera), such as Hackerobrachys viridiventris and Sextius virescens.

Toxicity 
Some species of acacia contain psychoactive alkaloids, and some contain potassium fluoroacetate, a rodent poison.

Uses 

The seed pods, flowers, and young leaves are generally edible either raw or cooked.

Aboriginal Australians have traditionally harvested the seeds of some species, to be ground into flour and eaten as a paste or baked into a cake. The seeds contain as much as 25% more protein than common cereals, and they store well for long periods due to the hard seed coats. In addition to utilizing the edible seed and gum, the people employed the timber for implements, weapons, fuel and musical instruments. A number of species, most notably A. mangium (hickory wattle), A. mearnsii (black wattle) and A. saligna (coojong), are economically important and are widely planted globally for wood products, tannin, firewood and fodder. A. melanoxylon (blackwood) and A. aneura (mulga) supply some of the most attractive timbers in the genus. Black wattle bark supported the tanning industries of several countries, and may supply tannins for production of waterproof adhesives.

Wattle bark collected in Australia in the 19th century was exported to Europe where it was used in the tanning process.

In ancient Egypt, an ointment made from the ground leaves of an Acacia (sensu lato) was used to treat hemorrhoids.

The hardened sap of various species of the acacia tree (sensu lato) are known as acacia gum. Acacia gum is used as an emulsifier in food, a binder for watercolour painting, an additive to ceramic glazes, a binding in gum bichromate photography, a protective layer in the lithographic processes and as a binder to bind together fireworks.

"Acacia honey" is not collected from plants in the acacia family, but rather from Robinia pseudoacacia, known as black locust in North America. Honey collected from Caragana arborescens is sometimes also called (yellow) acacia honey. (See also Monofloral honey.)

Cultivation
Some species of acacia – notably A. baileyana, A. dealbata and A. pravissima – are cultivated as ornamental garden plants. The 1889 publication Useful Native Plants of Australia describes various uses for eating.

In culture
Acacia is mentioned in an ancient Egyptian proverb referred to by Amenhotep II: "If you lack a gold battle-axe inlaid with bronze, a heavy club of acacia wood will do."

Acacia (in a broader sense) is repeatedly mentioned in the Book of Exodus, perhaps referring to Vachellia tortilis (previously known as Acacia raddiana), in regards to the construction of the Tabernacle.
In Exodus 25:10, acacia wood is mentioned as the construction material for the Ark of the Covenant.

References
 Pedley, L. (2002). "A conspectus of Acacia subgen. Acacia in Australia". Austrobaileya 6(2): 177–186.
 Pedley, L. (2003). A synopsis of Racosperma C.Mart". Austrobaileya 6(3): 445–496.

External links

 WATTLE Acacias of Australia Lucid Web Player (multi-access key for identifying Australian Acacias)

 
Fabaceae genera
Mimosoids